Pretty Big Feet, released in the United States as For the Children, is a 2002 Chinese film directed by Yang Yazhou. It stars Ni Ping as a teacher in an extremely impoverished and barren town in Ningxia, and Yuan Quan as a volunteer teacher coming from Beijing to help the local education.

The film won 4 awards at the Golden Rooster Awards.

Awards

External links

Course materials from the College of Wooster: Character Summaries, Student Reviews

Chinese drama films
Films set in Ningxia
2002 films
2000s Chinese films